Sultan Idris Education University (commonly abbreviated as UPSI; Jawi: اونيۏرسيتي ڤنديديقن سلطان إدريس) is a public university in the town of Tanjung Malim, Perak in Malaysia. First established in 1922 as a teachers college, it is one of the oldest functioning institutions of higher learning in Malaysia.

History

The first teacher training center in Malaya was originally located in Taiping and was known as the Matang Teacher Training College. Opened in 1913, the house of the Malay noble of Taiping, Ngah Ibrahim served as the first teacher training college in Malaya until it was shifted to Tanjung Malim nine years later and given the name of the Sultan of Perak at that time. The history of UPSI as we know it today dates to 1922 when the university was then known as the Sultan Idris Training College (SITC). It was set mooted by the deputy director of Malay schools, R.O. Winstedt as a training college for Malay teachers. Named after the late Sultan Idris Murshidul Azam Shah, the 28th Sultan of Perak, the college was opened on 29 November 1922 by the chief secretary of the Federated Malay States, Sir George Maxwell.

The initial instructional regime required students to complete a three-year course of training where traditional skills and arithmetic were taught. With the adoption of the Education Ordinance 1957 based on the recommendations of the 1956 Education Committee Report (better known as the Razak Report), the training course was extended to five years and new subjects were introduced. SITC also came to be officially known by its Malay name, Maktab Perguruan Sultan Idris or MPSI.

In 1976, MPSI became co-educational with the admission of the first batch of 150 female students. In 1987, MPSI was upgraded and renamed Institut Perguruan Sultan Idris or IPSI and new courses were made available leading to a degree conferred by Universiti Pertanian Malaysia (today known as Universiti Putra Malaysia). In 1997, IPSI was upgraded into the present-day university and renamed Sultan Idris Education University.

Campus

UPSI has two campuses, the Sultan Abdul Jalil Shah Campus (KSAJS) and the Sultan Azlan Shah Campus (KSAS). The main campus is on a 300-acre site in the town of Tanjung Malim that straddles both the Perak and Selangor state border. A new campus is on an  site in the new township of Proton City, 5 kilometres from the current campus.

Faculty
Total of nine faculty has been established namely:
 Faculty of Arts, Computing and Creative Industries (FSKIK)
 Computing
 Creating Multimedia 
 Art and Design
 Faculty of Science and Mathematics (FSMT)
 Faculty of Management and Economics (FPE)
 Faculty of Sports Science and Coaching (FSSK)
 Faculty of Music and Performing Arts (FMSP)
 Music & Music Education
 Dance
 Theater
 Faculty of Languages and Communication (FBK)
 Faculty of Social Sciences and Humanities (FSK)
 Faculty of Technical and Vocational Education (FPTV)
 Faculty of Human Development (FPM)

Alumni
 H.M. Salleh - Founder and Former Deputy of Partai Rakyat Brunei
 Pengiran Mohammad Yusof Rahim - Former Chief Minister of Brunei from 1967 to 1972 and writer of Brunei's National Anthem
 Jamil Umar - Principal of the Brunei History Centre and the Father of Brunei's Modern History
 Marsal Maun - Former Chief Minister of Brunei (1961-1962) and founder of P.G.G.M.B Brunei and Brunei Scouts Movement
 Basir bin Taha - One of Brunei's First Teachers
 Pendeta Za'ba - Academician, Grammarian, Known as the Father of the Modern Malay Language
 Ibrahim Yaacob - Malay leftist leader, Founder of Kesatuan Melayu Muda
 Ghafar Baba - Former Deputy Prime Minister of Malaysia
 Abdul Rahman Talib - Former Minister of Education (Malaysia)
  Adam Adli Abd Halim - Deputy Minister of Youth and Sports (Malaysia)

References

External links

 Universiti Pendidikan Sultan Idris

 
Universities and colleges in Perak
Educational institutions established in 1922
1922 establishments in British Malaya
Educational institutions in Malaysia